is a method of obtaining a doctoral degree, peculiar to Japan, by way of dissertation without taking or completing a course of study at the university. "Ronbun" (論文) means thesis or dissertation and "Hakase" (博士) means doctoral degree in Japanese. It is also called Otsu(-gō) Hakase〈乙(号)博士〉.　The alternative way of obtaining doctoral degree in Japan is Katei Hakase, also called Kō(-gō) Hakase〈甲(号)博士〉 which is the usual way of obtaining doctoral degree in other countries and requires the applicant/candidate to write the dissertation under the guidance of doctoral advisor professor while taking a course of study at the doctoral course. The letter 乙 is written usually at the beginning of the degree number of Ronbun Hakase, namely Otsu(-gō) Hakase〈乙(号)博士〉, like 乙第12345号, while the letter 甲 is written usually at the beginning of the degree number of Katei Hakase, namely Kō(-gō) Hakase〈甲(号)博士〉, like 甲第67890号.

Overview
The universities which have the doctoral course(s) in Japan are basically qualified to confer doctoral degree on the person who has the academic ability equivalent or superior to the person whom the doctoral degree has been already conferred on even though he/she didn't have the chance of taking or completing a course of study at the doctoral course of the degree-granting university for family or other reasons previously. This type of doctoral degree is called "Ronbun Hakase" (translated in English as "doctoral degree by way of dissertation" in general, "Doctoral Degree (Thesis / Dissertation)" by Kyoto University or "Doctorate in Kateigai" by Waseda University) which can be obtained by passing the review of the dissertation written without the guidance of doctoral advisor/D-maru-gō professor. The dissertation/thesis, after submitted to the degree-granting university, is to be examined by its committee for the dissertation review, while the applicant doesn't have to take or complete a course of study at the doctoral course of the university.

Ronbun Hakase is juxtaposed against and compared with "Katei Hakase" (translated in English as "doctoral degree after completing a course of study" in general, "Doctoral Degree (Course)" by Kyoto University or "Doctorate in Kateinai" by Waseda University) which can be obtained by completing a course of study and the dissertation under the guidance of his/her doctoral advisor/D-maru-gō professor and passing the review of the newborn dissertation by the committee for the dissertation review with the attendance of his/her doctoral advisor/D-maru-gō professor as the chairperson in the final stage of the doctoral course. Katei means (doctoral) course and Hakase means doctoral degree in Japanese. "Katei Hakase" is also called Kō(-gō) Hakase〈甲(号)博士〉.

Ronbun Hakase is rare in comparison with Katei Hakase (the usual way of obtaining a doctoral degree), because in order to obtain "Ronbun Hakase" it is required that the applicant/candidate has previously published more peer-reviewed treatises than the degree-granting university requires at the time of the application, the applicant/candidate has published many unrefereed treatises as his/her background and he/she has the track record of presentations at international conferences, the experience of taking office of the member of some committee(s) of academic society and so on. Moreover, even if he/she is recognized as the person with the advanced academic ability by the examination carried out by the university, "Ronbun Hakase" is not always conferred on him/her.

There are some opinions that "Ronbun Hakase" peculiar to Japan should be considered in the direction of its abolition. On the other hand it is thought significant to some extent from the perspective of promoting the transition to lifelong learning system as the policy of Ministry of Education, Culture, Sports, Science and Technology for doctoral degree to be conferred on the (working) person who can be independently engaged in research activities, has abundant learning as its base and can be deemed as the person with the academic ability equivalent or superior to the person whom the doctoral degree has been already conferred on. Even though the percentage of "Ronbun Hakase" to the total number of doctoral degrees awarded is decreasing, there are still many persons who had to work for family or other reasons without having a chance of taking a course of study at the doctoral course but wishes to obtain doctoral degree after accumulating considerable experience in government office, public research institute or company.

Degree holders
Tokiharu Abe
Hideroku Hara
Mamoru Ozaki
Kenkichi Yabashi

References 

Higher education in Japan